Keith Fraser (born 4 February 1968) is a Scottish-born skier who represented Swaziland (as a naturalised citizen of that country) at the 1992 Winter Olympics in Albertville, France. He competed in three events: Slalom, where he failed to finish the first run; Giant Slalom, where he came 63rd (starting No.98 from 131 skiers) ; and Super G, finishing 79th (out of 118 skiers). So far, he is the only athlete to have represented Swaziland in the Winter Olympic Games.

Keith, known locally as "Swaz" now works as a part-time ski instructor / trainer at Vail in Colorado, USA.  He also serves as an instructor examiner with the Rocky Mountain Division of PSIA, the national association of instructors in the USA.

Keith, a graduate of George Watsons College and later Heriot-Watt University also works as a Civil Engineer.

External links
Sports-Reference.com
GS Result
Super G result
Vail, CO
PSIA

1968 births
Living people
Swazi male alpine skiers
Scottish male alpine skiers
Alpine skiers at the 1992 Winter Olympics
Olympic alpine skiers of Eswatini
Waterford Kamhlaba alumni
People educated at a United World College
Alumni of Heriot-Watt University